Arachnactidae is a family of tube-dwelling anemones in the order Ceriantharia. It is the only family in the monotypic order Penicillaria and comprises around 38 species. They differ from other ceriantharians in the makeup of their cnidome (the types of cnidocyte present), the relative sizes of the oral discs and the shape and structure of the mesenteries. These tube anemones dwell in parchment-like tubes immersed in soft sediment, and have two whorls of tentacles, the outer ones being much longer than the inner ones.

Genera
The World Register of Marine Species includes the following genera in the family :
 Anactinia Annandale, 1909
 Arachnactis Sars, 1846
 Arachnanthus Carlgren, 1912
 Dactylactis Van Beneden, 1897
 Isapiactis Carlgren, 1924
 Isarachnactis Carlgren, 1924
 Isarachnanthus Carlgren, 1924
 Isovactis Leloup, 1942
 Ovactis Van Beneden, 1897
 Paranactinia Carlgren, 1924

References

Ceriantharia